Corazón (Spanish "heart") may refer to:

Film and TV
 Corazón (film), a 1947 Argentine film
 Corazon, an episode from season 6, of Criminal Minds

Music

Albums
 Corazón (Ednita Nazario album), 1999
 Corazón (Fonseca album), 2005
 Corazón (Santana album), 2014
 Corazones, album by Los Prisioneros, 1990

Songs
"Corazón" (Claudia Leitte song), 2015
 "Corazón" (Ricky Martin song), 1997
"Corazón" (Maluma song), 2017
 "Corazon", a song by Bishop Allen
 "Corazón", a song by Juan Ramón
 "Corazón" (Carole King song), on the 1973 album Fantasy
 "Corazón", a song by Hank Crawford, from the 1973 album Wildflower
 "Corazon", a song by Maîtres Gims, 2018
 "Oh My Corazón", a song by Tim Burgess, 2003

Other uses
 Corazón (volcano), a volcano in  Ecuador
 Corazon Aquino (1933–2009), president of the Philippines
 Corazon (drag queen), Filipino drag queen